This is a list of villages in the Northern Mariana Islands.  They include:

On Alamagan:
Alamagan Village (evacuated 2010)

On Agrihan:
Agrihan Village (evacuated 1990)

On Anatahan:
Anatahan Village (evacuated 1990)

On Pagan:
Bandara Village (abandoned)
Marasu (evacuated 1981)
Shomushon (evacuated 1981)

On Sarigan:
Sarigan Village (abandoned)

On Rota:
Chugai
Sinapalo
Shinapaaru
Songsong

On Saipan:
Achugao
As Lito
As Matuis
As Perdido
As Teo
As Terlaje
Capital Hill
Chalan Galaidi
Chalan Kanoa
Chalan Kiya
Chalan Piao
Chinatown
Dandan
Fina Sisu
Garapan
Gualo Rai
Kagman
Kalabera
Kannat Tabla
Koblerville
Laulau
Marpi
Matansa
Navy Hill
Papago
Puerto Rico
Sadog Tasi
San Antonio
San Jose
San Roque
San Vicente
Susupe
Tapochao
Talafofo
Tanapag

On Tinian:
Carolinas Heights
Marpo Heights
Marpo Valley
San Jose
Tinian Village
Unai Dankulo

All the other islands are uninhabited.

See also
Villages of Guam
List of cities by country

Populated Places
Northern Mariana Islands
Northern Mariana
Northern Mariana